Victor M. Pichardo (born August 27, 1984) is a former Democratic member of the New York State Assembly representing 86th New York State Assembly District, which includes the university and Morris Heights, Mount Eden, Kingsbridge, Tremont, and Fordham sections of the Bronx.

Early life and career
He attended the State University of New York at Buffalo where he earned a Bachelor of Arts degree in communications.

Pichardo went on to work for U.S. Senator Chuck Schumer as a staff assistant and was eventually promoted to Community Outreach Coordinator. During his time with Senator Schumer, Pichardo worked on such important issues such as Comprehensive Immigration Reform, the DREAM Act and the Affordable Care Act.

After serving for 4 years in Senator Schumer's office, Pichardo became an associate director of Public Relations at Mercy College. In 2012, Pichardo left Mercy to join New York State Senator Gustavo Rivera’s staff as Director of Community Affairs.

Political career
Pichardo was elected to the New York State Assembly in a November 2013 special election. In the special election, Pichardo was endorsed by U.S. Senator Chuck Schumer, State Senator Gustavo Rivera, and then-Bronx Democratic Party Chairman Carl Heastie.

In 2014, Pichardo was re-elected to a full term in the New York State Assembly with 95 percent of the vote. He defeated challengers Rene Santos and Jose Marte.

In 2016, Pichardo was re-elected to a full term in the New York State Assembly with the highest  percentage of the vote.

In August 2021, Victor Pichardo announced that he will quit being a member of the New York State Assembly after serving 8 years (4 terms) representing his assembly district in the Bronx before the redistricting process begins.  He cited a need to spend more time with his wife and two children.

References

External links
New York Assembly Member Website
Victor Pichardo for Assembly Campaign Website
Hon. Victor Pichardo on Facebook
Victor Pichardo on Twitter

American politicians of Dominican Republic descent
Living people
Hispanic and Latino American state legislators in New York (state)
University at Buffalo alumni
1984 births
Democratic Party members of the New York State Assembly
People from the Bronx
Working Families Party politicians
21st-century American politicians